Miķelis Ežmalis (born 12 August 1990 in Limbaži) is a Latvian sprint canoer who competed in the late 2000s. He participated in the 2008 Summer Olympics in Beijing, and was the youngest member of the Latvian team at 17. He was eliminated in the semifinals of both the C-1 500 m and the C-1 1000 m events.

References

Sports-Reference.com profile

1990 births
Living people
People from Limbaži
Latvian male canoeists
Canoeists at the 2008 Summer Olympics
Olympic canoeists of Latvia
Canoeists at the 2015 European Games
European Games competitors for Latvia